Mehdi Saâda (born 24 June 1987) is a retired Tunisian football midfielder.

References

1987 births
Living people
Tunisian footballers
CS Hammam-Lif players
US Monastir (football) players
Étoile Sportive du Sahel players
AS Gabès players
Association football midfielders
Tunisian Ligue Professionnelle 1 players